Ali Divandari (also Romanized as Alī Divāndarī, ; Born 6 September 1957 in Sabzevar) is an Iranian cartoonist, painter, graphic designer, sculptor and journalist.

Biography 
Divandari studied graphics at the Faculty of Fine Arts in Tehran University. He began his career as graphic designer and cartoonist in 1975. In 1997, he directed a new International Cartoon Festival in Iran with a main theme of "man and Nature – Only one, Share & Care". Over his career, Divandari was a jury member of several cartoon exhibitions in Iran and Turkey. His works have been published in many international newspapers and magazines and have been exhibited in more than 34 countries.

Exhibitions

Solo exhibitions 
 Kavir Gallery / Sabzevar-Iran / 1976
 Andisheh Gallery / Tehran-Iran / 21–30 Jan 1996 / 50 Works
 Abshar Art House / Sabzevar-Iran / Sep–Oct 2000 / 30 Works
 Seyhun Art Gallery / Tehran-Iran / 20–25 Apr 2002 / 30 Works
 Yasemi Gallery / Tabriz-Iran / 18–22 Oct 2002 / 40 Works
 Kolbe-ye-Javan Gallery / Ardebil-Iran / 10–18 Aug 2004 / 36 Works
 Isfahan Cartoon House / Isfahan-Iran / 29 Aug-9 Sep 2004 / 40 Works
 Sales Art Gallery / Tehran-Iran / 7–20 Jan 2005 / 28 Works
 Aban Art Gallery / Tehran-Iran / 22–27 Jan 2005 / 30 Works
About 300 Works in 9 Solo Exhibitions since 1976

Group exhibitions 
 Afrand Art Gallery / Tehran-Iran / 26 Dec 1994 – 5 Jan 1995 / 8 Works
 Iran Art Gallery / Tehran-Iran / 25 Feb-6 Mar 1996 / 10 Works
 Seyhun Art Gallery / Tehran-Iran / 14–19 Jul 2007 / 12 Works
About 32 Works in 3 Group Exhibitions since 1995

Publications

Book 
Title: Smile Monalisa
Drawings & Cartoons by Ali Divandari
Rozane Publications
Graphic Designer: Jamal Rahmati
270 Pages – Grayscale
First Edition: 2001

Awards

Panorama

External links
Toons Mag Toons Mag 
Artbreak
Fine Art America
Cyber Int'l Cartoon Gallery
qoqnoos.com
iranian.com
Googlm
satyrykon.pl
Facebook Personal Account

References

Iranian caricaturists
Iranian cartoonists
Living people
Iranian sculptors
Iranian graphic designers
1957 births
People from Sabzevar
20th-century Iranian painters
21st-century Iranian painters